Nana (stylized as NANA) is a Japanese manga series written and illustrated by Ai Yazawa. It was serialized in the monthly  manga magazine Cookie from May 2000 to May 2009 before going on hiatus. The series centers on Nana Osaki and Nana Komatsu, two women who move to Tokyo at the age of 20, with the story focused on Nana O.'s pursuit for fame and Nana K.'s pursuit for romance, all while struggling to maintain their friendship.

The manga was adapted into a live-action film in 2005, with a sequel released in 2006. An anime television series adaptation by Madhouse directed by Morio Asaka aired on Nippon TV between April 2006 and March 2007. All Nana media has been licensed for English language release in North America by Viz Media, which serialized the manga in their Shojo Beat magazine until the August 2007 issue, while also publishing it in the tankōbon format. They released both films in 2008, and their English dub of the anime was broadcast on the Funimation Channel beginning in September 2009.

In 2002, Nana won the 48th Shogakukan Manga Award for shōjo category. As of September 2019, the manga had over 50 million copies in circulation, making it one of the best-selling manga series.

Plot

On March 5, 2001, Nana Osaki and Nana Komatsu (nicknamed Hachi) cross paths when they both move to Tokyo after turning 20 years old: Nana O. to pursue a professional music career with her band, Black Stones, on her own merit; and Nana K. to join her friends and move in with her boyfriend. Despite having different personalities and ambitions, the two women find commonalities with each other and, by coincidence, move into the same apartment. However, as they follow their dreams, troubles of fame and love begin to test their friendship.

As the two women continue their lives in Tokyo, Nana K. breaks up with her boyfriend after he cheats on her, while Nana O. reunites with her ex-boyfriend Ren, the guitarist of Japan's current top band, Trapnest. Nana O.'s relationship with Ren eventually leads Nana K. into starting an on-and-off relationship with Trapnest's bassist, Takumi, causing her friendship with Nana O. to become awkward, while falling in love with Black Stones' guitarist, Nobu, at the same time. Ultimately, when Nana K. becomes pregnant, she chooses to marry Takumi instead. Nana O. begins to suffer from panic attacks at the thought of losing Nana K., but she later resolves to win her back from Trapnest by using the popularity and success of Black Stones.

When a tabloid magazine exposes Nana O. and Ren's relationship, this causes Black Stones to skyrocket in popularity and formally debut. Nana O. and Ren, however, start facing troubles in their relationship due to Nana O.'s jealousy of Trapnest and Ren's drug addiction, even as they become engaged. As the tabloids continue to target Black Stones and Trapnest, Nana K. begins to learn secrets behind Nana O.'s family history, including her birth mother. Shortly before Black Stones begin their first tour, their bassist, Shin, is arrested, causing Nana O. to embark on a solo career in the meantime. As she begins to make a name for herself, Ren dies in a car accident. While recovering from his death, Nana O. begins to question her dependency on Nana K. as well as the change in their relationship.

Starting with volume 12, scenes that take place years later are interspersed in the series, showing that in the present, Nana O. is rumored to have died, but Nana K. and her friends learn that she fled to England and try to find her.

Media

Manga

Written and illustrated by Ai Yazawa, Nana first appeared as a one-shot in 1999 in Vol. 1 and Vol. 2 of Shueisha's Cookie, a sister magazine of Ribon. Nana was later serialized in Cookie, starting in the July 2000 issue (published on May 26), when it was relaunched as a monthly magazine. Nana ran in the magazine for 84 chapters, until the July 2009 issue (published on May 26), and the series was put on hiatus in June of the same year due to Yazawa falling ill. Yazawa returned from the hospital in early April 2010, but it was not specified when or if she would resume the manga. The individual chapters of Nana have been collected by Shueisha into twenty-one tankōbon volumes, published under the Ribon Mascot Comics Cookie imprint, between May 15, 2000 and March 13, 2009. Its latest four chapters have not been published in a tankōbon volume.

Nana is licensed for English-language release in North America by Viz Media. It was serialized in Viz's manga anthology Shojo Beat, premiering in the July 2005 debut issue and continuing until the August 2007 issue. They published all 21 collected volumes as of July 6, 2010.

Films

Two live-action film adaptations have been made for Nana. The first, Nana, was released on September 3, 2005. The film stars Mika Nakashima as the punk star Nana Oosaki, Aoi Miyazaki as Hachi (Nana Komatsu), Ryuhei Matsuda as Ren Honjou, Tetsuji Tamayama as Takumi Ichinose, Hiroki Narimiya as Nobuo Terashima, and Kenichi Matsuyama as Shinichi Okazaki. The DVD edition was released on March 3, 2006. The film did quite well at the Japanese box office, grossing more than 4 billion yen, and staying in the top 10 for several weeks.
A sequel, Nana 2, was announced right after the first film debuted. However, on August 4, 2006, Toho stated that shooting would begin mid-September and that the film was to be released on December 9, 2006. Miyazaki, Matsuda and Matsuyama would not be reprising their respective roles as Hachi, Ren and Shin; as such, their roles were assigned to Yui Ichikawa, Nobuo Kyo and Kanata Hongō, respectively. Some locations from the manga had been changed for the film, and many plot differences were introduced as well.

Anime

An animated adaptation of Nana was produced by Nippon Television, VAP, Shueisha and Madhouse and directed by Morio Asaka, with Tomoko Konparu handling series composition, Kunihiko Hamada designing the characters and Tomoki Hasegawa composing the music. The series aired from April 5, 2006 to March 27, 2007. The first and third openings and third ending songs are sung by Anna Tsuchiya, who provides the singing voice for Nana Osaki, while the second opening and first and second endings were sung by Olivia Lufkin, who provides the singing voice for Reira Serizawa. The series was published and distributed on 17 DVD volumes by VAP from July 7, 2006 to November 21, 2007. The highest average TV ratings for the series was 6.3% in the Kanto region, which was unusually high for a late night anime. In 2007, Viz Media licensed the anime for release in North America and released it on four DVD box sets between September 2009 and April 2010, including an English dub. Funimation acquired the broadcast rights to Viz Media's dub and it premiered on the Funimation Channel on September 19, 2009. After Viz Media lost the rights, Sentai Filmworks re-licensed the series in 2021 and premiered on its HIDIVE service on April 22 that same year.

The anime was intended to be equal to the manga, and adapted up to the first chapter of volume 12 to avoid filler. In April 2007, when asked about a continuation of the anime, Junko Koseki (editor of Nana in Shueisha) and Masao Maruyama (former managing director of Madhouse) stated that they had decided to wait until the manga ends before producing more material.

Tribute albums
Nana has inspired several image and tribute albums, including Punk Night: From Nana and Nana's Song is My Song in 2003. Love for Nana: Only 1 Tribute, an album released by EMI Music Japan on March 16, 2005. Several famous artists contributed to it, including English musician Glen Matlock of the Sex Pistols, Canadian singer-songwriter Skye Sweetnam, and various Japanese artists.

Video games
A Nana video game for the PlayStation 2 platform was produced by Konami and released on March 17, 2005. A PlayStation Portable game,  was released on July 6, 2006. A Nintendo DS game,  was released by Konami in June 2007. The voice actors for the PS2 game did not return to reprise their roles for the PSP and DS games, which instead feature the anime's cast.

Reception
Along with Kaze Hikaru, Nana won the 48th Shogakukan Manga Award in the shōjo category in 2003; and was also nominated for the 10th Osamu Tezuka Cultural Award. The Young Adult Library Services Association in the United States listed the series in its "Great Graphic Novels for Teens" in 2007. Deb Aoki of About.com ranked Nana as the fifth "Must-Read" shōjo manga series in its "Top shojo Manga Must-Reads" list, with Aoki stating the manga is "a beautifully-drawn series that is filled with heartfelt drama, big city glamor, fabulous fashion, rock and roll sass and many unexpected twists." She also ranked the manga in its "50 Essential Manga for Libraries" list, noting its mature themes and "demonstrates the need for an adult collection." In a survey conducted by Goo in 2012 among 1,939 people, Nana was among the top favorite manga for women.

The first twelve volumes of the manga series have cumulatively sold over 22 million copies. As of September 2019, the manga had over 50 million copies in circulation.

Nana was the top favorite shōjo manga for Oricon Style in 2005. Volume 18 was the second highest selling manga series of 2007. During 2008, volume 19 was the third highest-selling manga and volume 20 was the fifth highest-selling manga in Japan, selling 1,645,128 and 1,431,335 copies respectively. By the end of the year, Nana was the sixth best selling manga with 3,122,146 copies sold. As of 2008, the manga series has sold over 43.6 million copies. In the first half of 2009, Volume 21 ranked as the third best selling manga, having sold 1.4 million copies. In the United States, volume twenty-one debuted at number 9 on the New York Times Graphic Books list for the week of July 10.

Notes

References

External links
  
  
 Nana at Viz Media
 

2000 manga
Ai Yazawa
Anime series based on manga
Fiction set in 2001
Madhouse (company)
Manga adapted into films
Music in anime and manga
Nippon TV original programming
Romance anime and manga
Shōjo manga
Shueisha manga
Viz Media anime
Sentai Filmworks
Shueisha franchises
Viz Media manga
Winners of the Shogakukan Manga Award for shōjo manga